The Hayus are a member of the Kirat tribe speaking their own language, Wayu or Hayu. Little is known about them. They are Animist by religion. According to the 2001 Nepal census, there are 1821 Hayu in the country, of which 70.29% were Hindus and 23.61% were animists.

The Hayu language has been documented by the linguist Boyd Michailovsky. The language currently appears in Wikipedia as 'Vayu'.

References

External links 
 Nationalities of Nepal
 Ethnologue profile
 Transcribed, annotated and translated recordings of narratives in Hayu, from the Pangloss Collection

Ethnic groups in Nepal